Kingsfield College is a co-education school founded in the year 2006. It is situated in Ikorodu Local Government Area of Lagos State, Nigeria. It provides a high school and junior high school curriculum, including preparation for the   Cambridge International Examination.

Background
Kings Field College is a boarding and day school. It's accredited by Lagos state Ministry of Education and West African Examinations Council. It runs an education development academics with majors in skills acquisition and environmental interaction.

Curriculum and extracurricular activities
The school has a curriculum committee which comprises Administrators, Teachers, and Parents. They are in charge of reviewing school curriculum. The academic curriculum is made up of Nigerian and British versions. The academy engage in series of extra curriculum activities such as literary and debates society; Press; Cultural and Heritage Societyl; and Business Club.

School boarding
The school operates a boarding system. Bedrooms are shared by students in small groups of 4-6 students. A staff-run hostel is another component of the school accommodations which promotes socialization and networking among the students. The hostel is governed by the rules and regulation of the school authority.

See also
 British International School Lagos

References

External links
 Official Website

Secondary schools in Lagos State
Cambridge schools in Nigeria
Schools in Lagos